SideCho Records was an independent record label based in Long Beach, California, which closed in 2011.

Artists
 Those Mockingbirds
 Peachcake
 Charlemagne
 Neva Dinova
 Michael Zapruder
 The Pale Pacific
 Sherwood
 Shiny Toy Guns
 Some by Sea
 Stars of Track and Field
 Tokyo Rose
 Blinded Black
 Via Audio
 The Silent Years
 MC Lars (for The Laptop EP)
 The Beautiful Mistake
 Death on Wednesday
 The 1090 Club

See also
 List of record labels

External links
 SideCho Records on MySpace

American independent record labels
Indie rock record labels